The Autovia B-24 is a highway in Spain.  The road connects Barcelona to the towns of Penedès.

It starts at a junction with the Autovía A-2 south of the City centre.  The road is under construction and will form an upgrade of the start of the N-340. Completion is planned by 2017.

References

B-24
Transport in Baix Llobregat
B-24